SX Arietis variables are a class of variable stars. They are generally B-type main sequence stars of spectral types B0p to B9p— high-temperature analogues of Alpha2 Canum Venaticorum variables—and exhibit strong magnetic fields and intense He I and Si III spectral lines. They have brightness fluctuations of approximately 0.1 magnitudes with periods of about one day. The prototype of this class is 56 Arietis, which bears the variable star designation SX Arietis.

List
The following list contains selected SX Arietis variable that are of interest to amateur or professional astronomy. Unless otherwise noted, the given magnitudes are in the V-band.

Notes

References

Samus N.N., Durlevich O.V., et al. Combined General Catalog of Variable Stars (GCVS4.2, 2004 Ed.)